Moraine Ridge is a small ridge in the northeastern part of the Cartographers Range, descending to the southwest flank of Tucker Glacier just south of the junction with Pearl Harbor Glacier, in Victoria Land, Antarctica. It was so named by the New Zealand Geological Survey Antarctic Expedition of 1957–58.

References

Ridges of Victoria Land
Borchgrevink Coast